The Navarrese Company was a company of mercenaries, mostly from Navarre and Gascony, which fought in Greece during the late 14th century and early 15th century, in the twilight of Frankish power in the dwindling remnant of the Latin Empire. "Navarrese Company" is a modern informal term for these soldiers and is thus somewhat inaccurate.

Origins
The first Navarrese Company was formed to fight for Charles II of Navarre against Charles V of France. In 1366, after peace was made, the mercenaries were organised into a coherent company of soldiers under Louis, Count of Beaumont-le-Roger in his own right and Duke of Durazzo in right of his wife, Joanna. Louis was a brother of Charles of Navarre, who supported his endeavour to recapture lost Durazzo and the regnum Albaniae. Charles of France likewise aided him with 50,000 ducats. 

In 1372, the Navarrese ranks began to swell through the recruiting techniques of Enguerrand VII de Coucy, who was hired to form a force of 500 lances and 500 mounted archers, mostly from Gascony. Though these soldiers were recruited for service in Albania, they were first organised in Naples. In 1375 and 1376, many men from Navarre began enlisting and travelled directly to Albania to join their countrymen. The enrollment lists for those years have been preserved in Pamplona and reveal the important presence of many engineers. The total number of men which left Tortosa between February 1375 and June 1376 was in the thousands. They were paid thirty gold Aragonese florins a month. 

In 1376, Louis and the Navarrese captured Durazzo, thus reestablishing the regnum Albaniae. Louis died that same year, leaving the Navarrese unemployed. They put themselves under at the command of the Peter IV of Aragon early in 1377 and were formed as four companies, commanded by four captains: the Gascon Mahiot of Coquerel and Pedro de la Saga and the Navarrese Juan de Urtubia and Guarro.

Morea
The Navarrese entered Morea in the spring or early summer of 1378, some coming at the invitation of Gaucher of La Bastide, the Hospitaller prior of Toulouse and commandant in the Principality of Achaea and others probably at the bequest of Nerio I Acciaioli. Gaucher hired Mahiot and the remnant of the company for eight months during the captivity of the Grand Master Juan Fernández de Heredia. Meanwhile, Juan de Urtubia was in Corinth with a following of more than 100 soldiers. 

After leaving the service of the Hospital, the Company took up with James of Baux, the latest claimant to Achaea. Indeed, Mahiot and the Navarrese governed the entire Morea under the auspices of James of Baux. In 1379, Urtubia with a large force invaded Boeotia and sacked Thebes—then under the control of the Catalan Company—with the assistance of the archbishop of the city, Simon Atumano. At this point, the Navarrese Company takes on a different character. Some men who had served under Urtubia are with Mahiot in the Morea again. The Company organised itself as a viceregal power in Achaea under three captains: Mahiot, Pedro de San Superano, and Berard de Varvassa. For the next two years, the Navarrese governed Achaea and often hired itself out to the Hospital. 

When James of Baux succeeded to the imperial title of Constantinople, the Navarrese leaders received imperial titles for upholding his rights in Achaea. When James died in 1383, the Navarrese were the reigning power in Frankish Greece and it fell to them the responsibility of reorganising the state and securing a new prince. While the Navarrese refused to recognise the heirs of James without proof which was too costly to provide, they remained in power in Achaea and were licensed by the barons of the realm to negotiate the treaty of 26 July 1387 with the Republic of Venice. In 1386, Pedro de San Superano succeeded Mahiot as the Company's leader.

Notes

Sources

 
 

14th century in Greece
Basque history
14th century in the Kingdom of Albania
Mercenary units and formations of the Middle Ages
Navarre
Frankokratia
Medieval Boeotia